Jim Kirchen (6 December 1932 – 5 December 1997) was a Luxembourgian racing cyclist. He rode in the 1953 Tour de France.

References

1932 births
1997 deaths
Luxembourgian male cyclists
Place of birth missing